Hiroshi Umemura was a Japanese mathematician and honored professor at Nagoya University. He was a prominent figure in the field of algebraic geometry and differential equations.

Biography

Umemura was born in Nagoya in 1944. He graduated from Nagoya University in 1967. At the beginning of his career, Umemura primarily studied the subgroups of the Cremona group. In the 1980s, while visiting the University of Strasbourg, he began studying Painlevé equations, particularly Galois theory. In 1996, Umemura wrote his first of multiple papers on Galois theory, which was influential in the community surrounding Painlevé equations in Japan. Umemura died on March 8, 2019. At the time, he had been working on an article titled Toward Quantization of Galois Theory with fellow mathematicians Akira Masuoka and Katsunori Saito. The article was published posthumously in 2020.

References

1944 births
2019 deaths
People from Nagoya
Japanese mathematicians
Nagoya University alumni